Strategic Imperial Conquest was a fantasy, play-by-mail game created by John Lagos. The turn-based game's goal was to build the largest kingdom in a medieval setting.  Players made decisions on economics (taxing cities), diplomacy, and making war with the goal of the game to reach 5,000 victory points.

Development
The game was playtested in 1992 with initial commercial availability scheduled for January 1993 with rulebooks costing $5, turns 1–5 at $2 each, and subsequent turns $4 each.  Reviewers Debra and Edward Leon Guerrero stated in the playtesting period that the game was "definitely worth the money".

See also
 List of play-by-mail games

References

Further reading
 

Play-by-mail games